is a Japanese professional footballer who plays as a defender for Zweigen Kanazawa.

References

External links

1996 births
Living people
Japanese footballers
Association football defenders
Renofa Yamaguchi FC players
U.D. Oliveirense players
Zweigen Kanazawa players
J2 League players
Liga Portugal 2 players
Japanese expatriate sportspeople in Portugal